El Rosario de Amozoc ("The Rosary of Amozoc") is a 1938 Mexican film directed by José Bohr. It stars Lupita Tovar, Carlos Orellana, Emilio Tuero, Elena D'Orgaz, Daniel "Chino" Herrera and Ernesto Cortázar.

External links
 

1938 films
1930s Spanish-language films
Mexican black-and-white films
Mexican comedy films
1938 comedy films
Films directed by José Bohr
1930s Mexican films